The University of Social Welfare and Rehabilitation Sciences (USWR) is a public university in Tehran, Iran. The university has three faculties including rehabilitation sciences, behavioural sciences, and educational sciences and social welfare. It is a specialized university in fields of rehabilitation, welfare, social health, and mental health.

Departments 
University of Social Welfare and Rehabilitation Sciences includes 22 different departments

Audiology
Basic Sciences
Biostatistics
Clinical Psychology
Clinical Sciences
Counseling
Ergonomics
Genetics
Gerontology
Nursing
Occupational Therapy
Orthotics and Prosthetics
Physical Therapy
Preschool Education
Psychiatry
Psychology and Education of Exceptional Children
Rehabilitation Management
Religious Studies
Social Welfare
Social Work
Speech Therapy
Health in Disaster and Emergency

Research Centers
Health in Emergency and Disaster Research Center
Aging Research Center
Genetics Research Center
Pediatric Neurorehabilitation Research Center
Psychosis Research Center
Social Determinants of Health Research Center
Social Welfare Management Research Center
Substance abuse and Dependency Research Center

Journals
Health in Emergencies & Disasters Quarterly (HDQ)
Salmand: Iranian Journal of Ageing
Iranian Rehabilitation Journal (IRJ)
Archives of Rehabilitation
Practice in Clinical Psychology
Social Welfare Quarterly

Hospitals and Rehab Centers
Razi psychiatric hospital
Rofeideh Rehabilitation Hospital
Asma rehabilitation Hospital
NezamMafi rehabilitation Hospital

References

External links
 "Official Website of the University of Social Welfare and Rehabilitation Sciences"

Social Welfare and Rehabilitation Sciences
Social Welfare and Rehabilitation Sciences
Education in Tehran Province
Buildings and structures in Tehran Province
1992 establishments in Iran